An e-reader is a device or computer program used for reading electronic books.

E-reader may also refer to:
 eReader (format), a file format for e-books
 Nintendo e-Reader, an add-on for the Game Boy Advance portable video game system
 A person who reads e-books